Patrick Lyons (6 January 1903 – 13 August 1967) was an Australian prelate of the Catholic Church. He was the third Bishop of Christchurch, New Zealand (1944–1950), Auxiliary Bishop of Sydney, New South Wales, Australia (1950–1957) and fourth Bishop of Sale, Victoria, Australia (1957–1967).

Early life
Patrick Francis Lyons was born in North Melbourne, as the second child of Patrick Joseph Lyons and his Irish-born wife Catherine Cecilia McMahon. He studied at St Mary's Primary School, West Melbourne and later at St. Joseph's CBC North Melbourne, run by the Christian Brothers, where he attained his Leaving Certificate. After matriculating from St Kevin's College, Melbourne he became a clerk in the Department of the Navy in 1918. He resigned four years later to pursue an ecclesiastical career. He attended St. Columba's College, St. Patrick's College, Melbourne and then entered the Pontifical Urbaniana University in 1923.

Priesthood
Lyons was ordained to the priesthood in Rome by Willem Cardinal van Rossum, CSSR, on his twenty-fourth birthday, 6 January 1927. After obtaining his doctorate in divinity in June of that same year, Lyons returned to Australia and then did pastoral work in Collingwood, Geelong, and Brunswick before joining the staff of St. Patrick's Cathedral in 1935. In 1938, he became administrator of the cathedral, archdiocesan chancellor, and private secretary to Archbishop Mannix. Lyons was named vicar general of Melbourne in 1939. During that same year, he established St. Patrick's Boys' Choir and choir school, incorporating members of the Vienna Boys' Choir displaced following the outbreak of World War II. In 1940, he was appointed cavaliere della Corona d'Italia in recognition of his services to the Italian community in Victoria.

Bishop of Christchurch
On 16 March 1944, Lyons was appointed the third Bishop of Christchurch, New Zealand, by Pope Pius XII. He received his episcopal consecration on the following 2 July from Archbishop Mannix, with Bishop Hugh O'Neill (Coadjutor Bishop of Dunedin) and Archbishop Matthew Beovich of Adelaide serving as co-consecrators, in St. Patrick's Cathedral, Melbourne. Lyons was Bishop of Christchurch for six years. One notable achievement during that time was the founding of Holy Name Seminary in Christchurch. The establishment of this seminary, and the invitation to the Jesuits to staff it, was largely on the initiative of Lyons (with the important support of Bishop Liston of Auckland). Lyons also purchased the land in West Christchurch for St Thomas of Canterbury College (which was built some years later) and invited the Christian Brothers to staff it.

Auxiliary Bishop of Sydney
Lyons returned to Australia upon being named Auxiliary Bishop of Sydney and Titular Bishop of Cabasa on 5 April 1950. He served as the episcopal leader of the Catholic Social Studies Movement in Sydney until 1954, during which time he incurred heavy resentment for dismissing Fr. Patrick Ryan, CSSM, as chaplain.

Bishop of Sale
Lyons was made Coadjutor Bishop of Sale on 11 October 1956, and in 1957 succeeded Richard Ryan, CM, as the fourth Bishop of Sale on 16 June 1957. During his tenure, Lyons oversaw the expansion of his diocese, adding several new parishes. Considered conservative, authoritarian and aloof, he attended the Second Vatican Council from 1962 to 1965 and remained cautious towards the implementation of the council's reforms.

Death
The Bishop died from cancer in East Melbourne, aged 64, and was interred in St. Mary's Cathedral in Sale.

References

External links
Catholic-Hierarchy
Australian Dictionary of Biography

1903 births
1967 deaths
Pontifical Urban University alumni
Australian people of Irish descent
Roman Catholic bishops of Christchurch
Deaths from cancer in Victoria (Australia)
Participants in the Second Vatican Council
Religious leaders from Melbourne
Roman Catholic bishops of Sale
Burials in Victoria (Australia)
20th-century Roman Catholic bishops in Australia
20th-century Roman Catholic bishops in New Zealand
Roman Catholic bishops of Sydney
People from North Melbourne
People educated at St Kevin's College, Melbourne
People educated at St Joseph's College, Melbourne